Newaygo may refer to:
 Newaygo, Michigan
 Newaygo County, Michigan
 Newaygo State Park, Michigan
 Newaygo (ship)